Zafar Ali (born 2 March 1986) is a Pakistani cricketer. He played in 30 first-class and 12 List A matches between 2004 and 2014. He made his Twenty20 debut on 7 February 2014, for Larkana Bulls in the 2013–14 National T20 Cup.

References

External links
 

1986 births
Living people
Pakistani cricketers
Hyderabad (Pakistan) cricketers